KZRB (103.5 FM) is a radio station broadcasting an urban contemporary format. Licensed to New Boston, Texas, United States, it serves the Texarkana area. The station is currently owned by B & H Broadcasting Systems, Inc.  The station's studios are located in Hooks, Texas and its transmitter is in unincorporated western Bowie County.

External links

Urban contemporary radio stations in the United States
ZRB